Latin Pop Albums is a record chart published in Billboard magazine that features Latin music sales information. This data are compiled by Nielsen SoundScan from a sample that includes music stores, music departments at electronics and department stores, Internet sales (both physical and digital) and verifiable sales from concert venues in the United States.

Below is the list of albums that reached number one on the Latin Pop Albums chart during the 1990s. Until July 17, 1993, charts were posted bi-weekly.

Number one albums
Key
 – Best-selling Latin pop album of the year

References
General

 For information about each week of this chart, follow this link; select a date to view the top albums for that particular week}}

Specific

Pop 1990s
United States Latin Pop Albums
1990s
1990s in Latin music